The Little Black River is a  river in Wylie Township, in northwestern Red Lake County, Minnesota. From its source — Goose Lake Swamp in the Pembina State Wildlife Management Area — the river runs south and southeast to the Black River, a tributary of the Red Lake River. Its waters ultimately drain via Canada's Nelson River into Hudson Bay.

See also
List of rivers of Minnesota

References

Minnesota Watersheds

USGS Hydrologic Unit Map - State of Minnesota (1974)

Rivers of Minnesota
Rivers of Red Lake County, Minnesota
Tributaries of Hudson Bay